Novelists (often known in print as Novelists FR) are a French progressive metalcore band from Paris who formed in 2013. They are currently signed to Out of Line Music.

History
Novelists was founded in 2013 by brothers Amael and Florestan Durand. Shortly after, Matteo Gelsomino, Nicolas Delestrade, and Charles-Henri Teule joined. In April 2014, they released a demo with 6 songs. In July 2015, they signed with the record label Arising Empire, and in November they released their debut studio album, Souvenirs. In June 2017, the band released the single "The Light, the Fire". After this, they toured with While She Sleeps and Northlane. A month later, they signed with SharpTone Records, and released their second studio album, Noir, in September 2017.

Novelists released their third studio album, titled C'est La Vie, in January 2020.

In April 2020, the band parted ways with Gelsomino as vocalist and started an online audition process to find a new singer.

On 27 October 2020, Novelists announced that Tobias Rische, formerly of Alazka, will be replacing Gelsomino as their new vocalist.
A month later, the band signed with Out of Line Music, a record label based in Berlin, and released the single "Lost Cause". Two further singles were released in 2021: "Terrorist" and "Do You Really Wanna Know?" The band supported Imminence on a European tour in May 2022 and play the Tech-Fest festival in the UK in June–July of the same year. In 2022, Novelists released two further singles, "Smoke Signals" and "Heretic", the latter featuring singer Florian Salfati of the band LANDMVRKS.

Musical style
The band's sound has been described as metalcore, with guitar styles heavily inspired by progressive metal and djent. They have been noted for primarily relying on clean vocals rather than screamed vocals, an uncommon practice in metalcore.

Members
Current
 Florestan Durand – guitar (2013–present)
 Amael Durand – drums (2013–present)
 Nicolas Delestrade  – bass guitar (2013–present)
 Tobias Rische – lead vocals (2020–present)
 Pierre Danel – guitar (2021–present)

Former
 Charles-Henri Teule – guitar (2013–2018)
 Matteo Gelsomino – lead vocals (2013–2020)

Timeline

Discography
Studio albums
 Souvenirs (2015)
 Noir (2017)
 C'est La Vie (2020)
 Déjà Vu: Première Partie (2022)

EPs
 Demo EP (2014)

Singles
 "Gravity" (2015)
 "The Light, the Fire" (2017)
 "Eyes Wide Shut" (2018)
 "After the Rain" (2020)
 "Lost Cause" (2020)
 "Terrorist" (2021)
 "Do You Really Wanna Know?" (2021)
 "Smoke Signals" (2022)
 "Heretic" (2022)

Music videos

References

External links
 

French metalcore musical groups
Musical groups from Paris
2013 establishments in France
Musical groups established in 2013
Arising Empire artists